Marcello De Dorigo (born 2 June 1937) is an Italian cross-country skier. He competed at the 1960 Winter Olympics and the 1964 Winter Olympics.

References

External links
 

1937 births
Living people
Italian male cross-country skiers
Olympic cross-country skiers of Italy
Cross-country skiers at the 1960 Winter Olympics
Cross-country skiers at the 1964 Winter Olympics
Sportspeople from the Province of Belluno